The Battle of Congaree Creek (also known as the Skirmish at Congaree Creek) was a four-hour action that took place in the waning days of the American Civil War, fought in Lexington County, South Carolina, on February 15, 1865, just south of Columbia on the site of the former town of Granby.

Battle
The battle featured the Union's Army of the Tennessee against the Confederacy's Army of Tennessee meeting at a half-mile-long earthwork erected by Southern forces near the Old State Road Bridge over Congaree Creek. Confederate General George Dibrell's dismounted cavalry brigade, supported by infantry and artillery, manned the earthworks, but General Charles Woods' 1st Division of General John A. Logan's XV Corps pushed skirmishers ahead while one of Woods' brigades crossed upstream and turned the Southerners' right flank. Dibrell's force withdrew from Congaree Creek and then from its earthworks, retreating to Columbia. Though the Confederates set fire to the bridge, the Federals saved it and made their camp nearby that night, according to a historical marker erected at the site by the 15th Regiment S.C. Volunteer Camp of the Sons of Confederate Veterans.

Aftermath
Two days later, Union General William T. Sherman's army advanced to Columbia.

References

External links
 Historical Marker hmdb.org

1865 in South Carolina
Battles of the American Civil War in South Carolina
Battles of the Eastern Theater of the American Civil War
1865 in the American Civil War
Richland County, South Carolina
February 1865 events